The Swiss order of precedence is a hierarchy of important positions within the government of Switzerland. It has no legal standing but is used by ceremonial protocol.
The order of precedence is determined by the Protocol Regulations
and the Table of Precedence
of the Federal Department of Foreign Affairs. Unless otherwise noted, precedence among persons of equal rank is determined by seniority. As a general rule, spouses share the same rank.

Table of precedence

Notes

References

Order of precedence
Switzerland